Mono may refer to:

Biology 
 Infectious mononucleosis, "the kissing disease" 
 Monocyte, a type of leukocyte (white blood cell)
 Monodactylidae, members of which are referred to as monos

Technology and computing 
 Mono (audio), single-channel sound reproduction
 Mono (software), a software framework

Music

Performers
 Mono (Japanese band), an instrumental band
 Mono (UK band), an electronic band
 MONO, Vietnamese male singer, Son Tung M-TP's younger brother
 Miky Mono, former member of Mono Inc., a German gothic rock band
 Richard Targett and the Monos, a side-project to The Trudy

Albums
 Mono (Alpha Wolf album) or the title song, 2017
 Mono (Fury in the Slaughterhouse album), 1993
 Mono (The Icarus Line album), 2001
 Mono (Lena Katina album) or the title song, 2019
 Mono (The Mavericks album), 2015
 Mono (mixtape), by RM, 2018
 Mono, by Paul Westerberg, packaged with Stereo, 2002

Songs
 "Mono" (song), by Courtney Love, 2004
 "Mono", by Fightstar from They Liked You Better When You Were Dead, 2005
 "Mono", by Monrose from Ladylike, 2010
 "Mono", by Whitechapel from Our Endless War, 2014

Places

United States
 Mono or Mono Mills, California, a ghost town
 Mono County, California
 Mono Village, Mono County, California, a former settlement
 Mono Lake, California
 Mono Pass, Yosemite National park, California

Elsewhere
 Mono Department, Benin
 Mono, Ontario, Canada, a town
 Monó, Romania, a village
 Mono Island, Solomon Islands
 Mono River, Togo

Ethnicities and languages
 Mono people, an ethnic group of California
 Mono people (Congo), an ethnic group the Democratic Republic of the Congo
 Mono language (California)
 Mono language (Cameroon)
 Mono language (Congo)
 Mono language (Solomon Islands), a dialect of Mono-Alu

Other uses 
 Mono-, a numerical prefix representing anything single
 BAC Mono, a British sports car which began production in 2011
 Mono, a character in the video game Little Nightmares II
 Mono, a character in the video game Shadow of the Colossus
 Mono (film), a 2016 American film featuring Sam Lerner
 Monomorphism, in abstract mathematics
 Order of Mono, a Togolese order of chivalry
 José María Gatica (1925–1963), Argentine boxer nicknamed "El Mono"

See also
 

Language and nationality disambiguation pages